In mathematics, Schubert calculus is a branch of algebraic geometry introduced in the nineteenth century by Hermann Schubert, in order to solve various counting problems of projective geometry (part of enumerative geometry). It was a precursor of several more modern theories, for example characteristic classes, and in particular its algorithmic aspects are still of current interest. The phrase "Schubert calculus" is sometimes used to mean the enumerative geometry of linear subspaces, roughly equivalent to describing the cohomology ring of Grassmannians, and sometimes used to mean the more general enumerative geometry of nonlinear varieties. Even more generally, "Schubert calculus" is often understood to encompass the study of analogous questions in generalized cohomology theories.

The objects introduced by Schubert are the Schubert cells, which are locally closed sets in a Grassmannian defined by conditions of incidence of a linear subspace in projective space with a given flag. For details see Schubert variety.

The intersection theory of these cells, which can be seen as the product structure in the cohomology ring of the Grassmannian of associated cohomology classes, in principle allows the prediction of the cases where intersections of cells results in a finite set of points, which are potentially concrete answers to enumerative questions. A supporting theoretical result is that the Schubert cells (or rather, their classes) span the whole cohomology ring.

In detailed calculations the combinatorial aspects enter as soon as the cells have to be indexed. Lifted from the Grassmannian, which is a homogeneous space, to the general linear group that acts on it, similar questions are involved in the Bruhat decomposition and classification of parabolic subgroups (by block matrix).

Putting Schubert's system on a rigorous footing is Hilbert's fifteenth problem.

Construction 
Schubert calculus can be constructed using the Chow ring of the Grassmannian where the generating cycles are represented by geometrically meaningful data. Denote  as the Grassmannian of -planes in a fixed -dimensional vector space , and  its Chow ring; note that sometimes the Grassmannian is denoted as  if the vector space isn't explicitly given. Associated to an arbitrary complete flag and a decreasing -tuple of integers  wherethere are Schubert cycles (which are called Schubert cells when considering cellular homology instead of the Chow ring)  defined asSince the class  does not depend on the complete flag, the class can be written aswhich are called Schubert classes. It can be shown these classes generate the Chow ring, and the associated intersection theory is called Schubert calculus. Note given a sequence  the Schubert class  is typically denoted as just . Also, the Schubert classes given by a single integer, are called special classes. Using the Giambeli formula below, all of the Schubert classes can be generated from these special classes.

Explanation 
However, once , then  and  will necessarily have nonzero intersection.

Properties

Inclusion 
There is a partial ordering on all -tuples where  if  for every . This gives the inclusion of Schubert cyclesshowing an increase of the indices corresponds to an even greater specialization of subvarieties.

Codimension formula 
A Schubert cycle  has codimensionwhich is stable under inclusions of Grassmannians. That is, the inclusiongiven by adding the extra basis element  to each -plane, giving a -plane, has the propertyAlso, the inclusiongiven by inclusion of the -plane has the same pullback property.

Intersection product 
The intersection product was first established using the Pieri and Giambelli formulas.

Pieri formula 
This formula is called the Pieri formula and can be used to determine the intersection product of any two Schubert classes when combined with the Giambelli formula. For exampleand

Giambelli formula 
Schubert classes with tuples of length two or more can be described as a determinantal equation using the classes of only one tuple. The Giambelli formula reads as the equationgiven by the determinant of a -matrix. For example,and

Relation with Chern classes 
There is an easy description of the cohomology ring, or the Chow ring, of the Grassmannian using the Chern classes of two natural vector bundles over the grassmannian . The Chern classes of these two associated bundles arewhere  is an -tuple andThe tautological sequence then gives the presentation of the Chow ring as

G(2,4) 
Schubert calculus can be used to find the number of lines on a Cubic surface.

Chow ring 
The Chow ring has the presentation
and as a graded Abelian group it is given by

Lines on a cubic surface 
This Chow ring can be used to compute the number of lines on a cubic surface. Since a cubic surface  is given as a generic homogeneous cubic polynomial, this is given as a generic section . The splitting equation gives the relations and .Since  can be read as the direct sum of formal vector bundleswhose total Chern class ishenceusing the fact and Then, the integral issince  is the top class. Therefore there are  lines on a cubic surface.

See also 

 Enumerative geometry
 Chow ring
 Intersection theory
 Grassmannian
 Giambelli's formula
 Pieri's formula
 Chern class
 Quintic threefold
 Mirror symmetry conjecture

References

 Summer school notes http://homepages.math.uic.edu/~coskun/poland.html
Phillip Griffiths and Joseph Harris (1978), Principles of Algebraic Geometry, Chapter 1.5
 

David Eisenbud and Joseph Harris (2016), "3264 and All That: A Second Course in Algebraic Geometry".

Algebraic geometry
Topology of homogeneous spaces